Rūta Paškauskienė (born 29 March 1977) is a Lithuanian table tennis player. Since 1994, she won several medals in singles, and doubles events in the Table Tennis European Championships.

She competed at the 2008 Summer Olympics, reaching the second round of the singles competition.

She was born in Kaunas, and resides there.

References

1977 births
Living people
Lithuanian female table tennis players
Table tennis players at the 1996 Summer Olympics
Table tennis players at the 2000 Summer Olympics
Table tennis players at the 2008 Summer Olympics
Olympic table tennis players of Lithuania
European Games competitors for Lithuania
Table tennis players at the 2015 European Games